The Twins's Such A Better Day is their second best songs collection album includes their hits along with 4 new songs released in December 2004.

Special edition package comes with free gifts:

Twins Souvenir Band
Twins Compact Mirror
Twins Photo Album

Second version comes with free gift:

Twins Wrist Band

Track listing
Disc 1
精選 (New)
冬令時間 (New)
士多啤梨蘋果橙
下一站天后
飲歌
千金
你講你愛我
女人味
夏日狂嘩
雙失情人節
大浪漫主義
二人世界盃
眼紅紅
女校男生

Disc 2
18變 (New)
追女仔 (New)
多謝失戀
死性不改 (Twins + Boy'z 合唱版)
愛情當入樽
亂世佳人
朋友的愛
戀愛大過天
丟架
大紅大紫
風箏與風
拍住上
梨渦淺笑
我們的紀念冊

2004 greatest hits albums
Twins (group) compilation albums